Clarke Scholtz (12 February 1912 – 20 February 1989) was a South African middle-distance runner. He competed in the men's 800 metres and 1500 metres at the 1936 Summer Olympics.

References

1912 births
1989 deaths
Athletes (track and field) at the 1936 Summer Olympics
South African male middle-distance runners
Olympic athletes of South Africa
People from South-East District (Botswana)
Bechuanaland Protectorate people